Binn is a Swiss municipality. Binn may also refer to:

Binn (serialization format), computer data serialization format used mainly for application data transfer
David Binn (born 1972), American football player
Jason Binn (born 1968), American publisher and entrepreneur
Binn., taxonomic author abbreviation of Simon Binnendijk (1821–1883), Dutch gardener and botanist

See also
"Binn", meaning "peak" in the Irish language, used in the names of mountains:
Binn Chaonaigh
Binn idir an dá Log
Binn Mhór
Bin (disambiguation)